Andrzej Tadeusz Szczepkowski (26 April 1923 – 31 January 1997) was a Polish actor. He appeared in more than 30 films and television shows between 1957 and 1997.

He is the father of actress Joanna Szczepkowska. In 1966, he was awarded the Commander's Cross of the Order of Polonia Restituta.

Szczepkowski is buried at the Powązki Cemetery in Warsaw.

Partial filmography

 Kapelusz pana Anatola (1957) - Gang Member
 Deszczowy lipiec (1958) - Wacek
 Kalosze szczescia (1958) - Giddy Actor
 Zolnierz królowej Madagaskaru (1958) - Wladyslaw Macki
 Pan Anatol szuka miliona (1959) - Bandit Chief
 Historia zóltej cizemki (1961) - bandyta 'Czarny Rafal'
 Wielka, wieksza i najwieksza (1963) - Ojciec Iki
 Mansarda (1963) - St. Witkiewicz
 Zacne grzechy (1963) - Przeor Ignacy
 Panienka z okienka (1964) - Jan Heweliusz
 Pingwin (1965) - Architect Pawel Baczek, Adas's Father
 Pieklo i niebo (1966) - Franciszek
 Colonel Wolodyjowski (1969) - Bishop Lanckoronski
 Epilog norymberski (1971)
 The Wedding (1973) - Nose
 Niebieskie jak Morze Czarne (1973) - Director Puc
 Nights and Days (1975) - Waclaw Holszanski
 Obrazki z zycia (1976) - Advocate
 Sprawa Gorgonowej (1977) - Wozniakowski
 Pasja (1978) - Wodzicki
 Sto koni do stu brzegów (1979)
 Sekret Enigmy (1979) - Col. Gustave Bertrand
 Jezioro Bodenskie (1986) - Thomson
 The Young Magician (1987) - Headmaster
 The Tribulations of Balthazar Kober (1988) - Le cardinal / Kardinal Nenni
 Rajski ptak (1988) - Profesor
 Dotknieci (1989) - Priest Karol
 Zycie za zycie. Maksymilian Kolbe (1991) - Górecki
 Argument About Basia (1995) - Antoni Walicki
 Towar (2006)

References

External links

1923 births
1997 deaths
Polish male film actors
People from Sucha Beskidzka
Polish male stage actors
Burials at Powązki Cemetery
Recipients of the Order of Polonia Restituta (1944–1989)